1,4-Diisocyanobutane is an organic compound. Its structural formula is CN(CH2)4NC, which similar to adiponitrile but with carbon and nitrogen of cyanide groups switching places.

References 

Isocyanides